Charles Henry Weeks "Chick" Manlove (October 8, 1862 – February 12, 1952) was a 19th-century Major League Baseball player born in Philadelphia, Pennsylvania. He played a total of five games in his career, collecting three hits in 17 at bats for a .176 career batting average.

Charlie died in Altoona, Pennsylvania, at the age of 89 of cerebral thrombosis, and is interred at Oakridge Cemetery.

References

External links

1862 births
1952 deaths
19th-century baseball players
Baseball players from Philadelphia
Major League Baseball catchers
Altoona Mountain Citys players
New York Gothams players
Reading Actives players
Altoona (minor league baseball) players
Altoona Mountain Cities players
Altoona Mountaineers players
Burials in Pennsylvania